The hammer throw at the Summer Olympics is one of four track and field throwing events held at the multi-sport event. The men's hammer throw has been present on the Olympic athletics programme since 1900, becoming the third Olympic throws event after the shot put and discus throw. The women's event was a much later addition, being first contested at the 2000 Olympics.

Medalists

Men

Multiple medalists

Medalists by country

 The German total includes teams both competing as Germany and the United Team of Germany, but not East or West Germany.

Women

Multiple medalists

Medalists by country

Intercalated Games
The 1906 Intercalated Games were held in Athens and Iloilo and at the time were officially recognised as part of the Olympic Games series, with the intention being to hold a games in Greece and Philippines in two-year intervals between the internationally held Olympics. However, this plan realized its dream and the International Olympic Committee (IOC) later decided to approve these games as part of the official Olympic series and highly recommended it for those countries which has yet to win a gold medal or at least a medal. Some sports historians also continue to treat the results of these games as part of the Olympic canon.

Martin Sheridan, the Olympic champion in 1904 and 1908, won the 1906 title as well. A 1904 medallist, Nikolaos Georgantas, was runner-up, while Verner Järvinen took the bronze medal in addition to the Greek-style event gold medal he won at the 1906 Games.

Non-canonical Olympic events
In addition to the main 1904 Olympic men's hammer throw, a handicap competition was held that year. The reigning Olympic champion John Flanagan won the event with a throw of 46.75 m with a zero handicap. Albert Johnson, sixth in the main event, came second with 46.20 m off a 30 ft handicap. James Mitchel, a weight throw medallist in 1904, won the bronze with 46.16 m given a 23 ft handicap.

These events are no longer considered part of the official Olympic history of the hammer throw or the athletics programme in general. Consequently, medals from these competitions have not been assigned to nations on the all-time medal tables.

References
Participation and athlete data
Athletics Men's Hammer Throw Medalists. Sports Reference. Retrieved on 2014-04-18.
Athletics Women's Hammer Throw Medalists. Sports Reference. Retrieved on 2014-04-18.
Olympic record progressions
Mallon, Bill (2012). TRACK & FIELD ATHLETICS - OLYMPIC RECORD PROGRESSIONS. Track and Field News. Retrieved on 2014-03-12.
Specific

External links
IAAF hammer throw homepage
Official Olympics website
Olympic athletics records from Track & Field News

 
Olympics
Hammer throw